Quincy School is a historic school building at 94 Newbury Avenue in Quincy, Massachusetts.  The two-story brick building was built in 1906 and enlarged in 1932; its original design was by Hurd & Gore, and the addition was by Hutchins & French.  A longtime elementary school, it closed in 1981 following city cutbacks in the wake of Proposition 2 1/2, and was subsequently sold to private developers for conversion to condominiums.

The building was listed on the National Register of Historic Places in 1983.

See also
National Register of Historic Places listings in Quincy, Massachusetts

References

School buildings on the National Register of Historic Places in Massachusetts
Colonial Revival architecture in Massachusetts
School buildings completed in 1906
Schools in Norfolk County, Massachusetts
Buildings and structures in Quincy, Massachusetts
National Register of Historic Places in Quincy, Massachusetts
1906 establishments in Massachusetts